Mainpuri district is one of the districts in the Agra division of Uttar Pradesh, India. Mainpuri town is the district headquarters. It consists of six tehsils, namely Mainpuri, Bhongaon, Karhal, Kishni, Kurawali and Ghiror.

Mainpuri forms part of the ancient legendary region of Lord Krishna's land called Braj.  It is bounded on the north by Etah district, on the east by the districts Farrukkhabad and Kannauj, on the south by Etawah district and on the west by the districts Firozabad and Etah. It lies between north latitude 260 53′ to 270 31′ and east longitude 780 27′ to 790 26′. According to the 2011 census, Mainpuri district has a population of 1,847,194. The district has a population density of 670 inhabitants per square kilometre (1,700/sq mi). Mainpuri has a sex ratio of 876 females for every 1000 males, and a literacy rate of 78.26%.

History 
Several copper harpoons and antenna swords have been found in Ganeshpur village in 2022 which are from Copper Hoard Culture.
Mainpuri formed part of the kingdom of Kanauj, and after its fall it was divided into a number of petty principalities, of which Rapri and Bhongaon were chief. In 1194 Rapri was made the seat of a Muslim governor. Mainpuri fell to the Mughal's on Baber’s invasion in 1526, and, although temporarily wrested from them by the short-lived Afghan dynasty of Shere Shah, was again occupied by them on the reinstatement of Humayun after the victory of Panipat. Like the rest of the lower Doab, towards the end of the 18th century Mainpuri passed into the power of the Mahrattas and finally became a portion of the province of Oudh. When this part of the country was ceded to the British in 1801, Mainpuri town became the headquarters of the extensive district of Etawah, which was in 1856 reduced by the formation of Etah and Mainpuri into separate collectorates. On the outbreak of the mutiny in 1857, the regiment stationed at Mainpuri revolted and attacked the town, which was successfully defended by the few Europeans of the station for a week, until the arrival of the Jhansi mutineers made it necessary to abandon the district.

Kak Nadi, Senghar Nadi, and Sehar Nadi were some of the rivers in the area which have since dried up.

Administration
The Mainpuri district is headed by an IAS officer of the rank of District Magistrate (DM). The district is further sub-divided into sub-divisions or Tehsils, each headed by a Sub Divisional Magistrate (SDM). 

These Tehsils are further divided into Blocks,  each headed by a Block development officer (BDO).

Tehsils
The six sub-divisions or Tehsils in Mainpuri are as follows:

 Mainpuri
 Bhogaon
 Karhal
 Kishni
 Ghiror 
 Kurawali

Blocks
The nine Blocks in Mainpuri are as follows:

 Mainpuri
 Ghiror
 Bewar
 Jagir
 Sultanganj
 Karhal
 Kurawali
 Kishni
 Barnahal

Geography
The district generally gives the appearance of an extensive level plain broken only by the sand ridges on the western border, the rolling sand hills and undulations of the Kali and Isan rivers, and the ravines along the Yamuna to the southwest. The Kali Nadi forms the boundary of this plain on the north and northeast and the Yamuna encloses it on the southwest. Both these rivers flow towards the southeast and between them. The general slope of the country is from northwest to southeast, taking the district from north to south.

Generally speaking, the soils of the district are typical of those found elsewhere in the Indo-Gangetic plain, and are classified on two principles according to whether the distinctions recognised are natural or artificial. Both are well-understood and commonly employed by the cultivator. Of the natural divisions bhur is the name for soil containing a large proportion of sand, while matyar is the name of soil containing a large proportion of clay. Between these two is a loamy soil called domat with clay and sand more evenly divided. A lighter soil is known as pilia, coming between domal and bhur. The barren soil known as usher is found at the heads and partly down the courses of the smaller rivers such as Ahnaiya and Puraha, the Sengar and Arind and the numerous minor esteems. It appears to be a clay deposit too compact to permit cultivation in places too impregnated with Reh and other deleterious mineral substances to permit the growth of even grass.

Wasteland: The barren land consists for the most part of usar plains.

A considerable area of the barren land is covered with dark jungle. A great deal of wasteland is covered with the coarse grass known locally as ganra (gandhar) or sinkh. Ganra is used for thatching and making ropes and mats. The babul grows in large clumps on the usar plains and is, indeed, the only tree which flourishes on them. Its cultivation has for some time been encouraged by the increase of moisture due to the canals and the great demand for wood both for fuel and carpentry. Its timber is hard and close-grained and is used for building purposes, fuel and charcoal.

Water Bodies

Kali Nadi 
The Kali Nadi forms the northeastern boundary of the district separating it from Etah and Farukkhabad. It is a narrow stream, but perennial, and even during the spring and summer months is only fordable at certain places. There is a bridge with a 545-foot span on the Farukkhabad Road.

Isan 
Next to the Kali comes the Isan, which is here a considerable stream, fordable only in a few places during the rainy season. During the remainder of the year the volume of running water is small, and in years of unusual drought there is no apparent stream, but the pools that remain are fed by the springs. During the first part of its course and to within four miles of its junction with Kali Nadi about three miles northwest of Mainpuri, it runs through a loam and usar country, has a comparatively shallow bed, and often overflows the neighbouring lands in times of flooding.

The Arind or Rind 
The Arind (or Rind as it is called further down its course) is an insignificant stream in this district, which it enters to the north of pargana Mustafabad, between the Etawah and Kanpur branches of the Ganges Canal, and traverses in an exceedingly sinuous course from the northwest to the southeast corner. A straight line from its point of entry to its point of exit is almost the longest which could be drawn on the district map. It presents a striking contrast to the Kali and Isan.

Lakes 
Mainpuri abounds in swamps and marshes, particularly in its central portion, but few of them are of sufficient size or permanence to be considered lakes. Mention will only be made here of the more considerable ones, and for the others reference should be made to the accounts of parganas. In all 36,870 acres are recorded in the revenue record as underwater, even the largest, as they are seldom supplied by springs. There is also a long narrow lake of considerable size to the southwest of Mainpuri city, between it and the Kanpur branch of the Ganges canal, which drains by two cuts towards the Isan.

Drainage 
The general slope of the country, is from northwest to southeast, and this is the direction in which the rivers run and which is therefore followed in the main by the drainage. There are however, numerous inequalities of surface caused by the greater or less elevation of the river beds and by sand bridges, and the general disposition of the drainage differs somewhat in different portions of the district. In the center tract, which lies highest, the main drainage arteries are the Isan and the Arind. Pargana Karhal has been seriously affected by the canal. The Kali and Isan and their catchment basins all belong to the Ganges system, and all the other rivers to that of the Yamuna.

Demographics

According to the 2011 census Mainpuri district has a population of 1,868,529, roughly equal to the nation of Kosovo or the US state of West Virginia. This gives it a ranking of 255th in India (out of a total of 640). Its population growth rate over the decade 2001-2011 was 15.69%. Mainpuri has a sex ratio of 876 females for every 1000 males, and a literacy rate of 78.26%. Scheduled Castes made up 19.71% of the population. Hindi is the predominant language, spoken by 99.57% of the population.

Mainpuri is a predominantly Hindu district, with Muslims as the largest minority. There are around 8,800 Buddhists in the district.

In Mainpuri, the total population is  approximately 12.3 lakh. voters are Yadavs, voters are Rajputs . Other castes include Shakyas, Brahmins, and SCs.

Culture 
The ethnic city Mainpuri was ruled by the Mughals, Marathas, Afghans and Nawabs in various time periods. Among them, the Mughal and Nawabs vastly influenced the culture of the city. Music, dance, architecture, arts and crafts flourished under their rule. Hindus, Muslims, Jains, Buddhists, Christians and Sikhs were the principal communities residing in the city. How festival created unity among Hindus and Muslims is a question? The Hindu culture of the joint family system was once adored in the city, which has slowly disintegrated due to rapid industrial development, urban development, economic issues and social features.

The rituals of the Vedic religion manifest themselves in the various festivals that are celebrated in this city. People usually do not consume non-vegetarian food on Thursdays. Its annual Janardhan Swami Temple, and Sivagiri Mutt festivals feature vibrant colors and spiritual expression. These festivals which last for days attract locals and tourists alike by the thousands. On Tuesdays the city celebrates the birth day of Lord Hanuman. Devotees flock to the local temples to offer prayers. The city fair is held at Sheetla Devi Temple in March or April; the nine days of worshiping the various avatars of the goddess Durga (i.e. Chaitra Navratri) occurs during these months. During these nine days, many of the locals also keep fasts where they eat only fruits during this period and men do not shave their beards or mustaches.

 Languages in Mainpuri : About two dozen languages were present in Mainpuri by 1971. At present about 97% of people speak Hindi, 2% muslims speak Urdu and the remaining 1% who came from Pakistan and Bangladesh due to Hindu Genocide speak other languages such as Bengali, Sindhi, Punjabi, and English. The Hindi dialect forms Braj Bhasha, Bhadauri and Bundeli are also spoken in the city.
 Arts in Mainpuri: Traditional art such as wooden sculptures, glassware, classic zari-worked silk sarees, pottery, rugs, and chikan embroidery depict Mainpuri culture and are available in the markets. Most of the Mainpuri arts and craft forms depict the Mughal designs. Hindustani, Ghazal and Qauwwali music are the traditional forms of music enjoyed by Mainpuris. The rasiya genre which portrays the divine love of Lord Krishna and Radha is also popular. Classical and folk dance such as Kathak and Charukala symbolise the cultural heritage of the city and state. The play Ramlila which describes the life of Lord Rama is staged during festive seasons.
 Fairs in Mainpuri: Cultural fairs, religious fairs and trade fairs are popular as they invite people of all backgrounds to celebrate. With Mainpuri being the district headquarters, the fairs attract large number of visitors and tourists from around the district. Fairs are also common during the festival seasons like Dusshera and Ramlila. The Devji fair in the village of Uddetpur under Mainpuri Tehsil falls on Chaitra and attracts nearly 20,000 people. The village Bidhuna hosts the biggest bathing fair in Mainpuri to celebrate Kaitiki purnima, which brings a lot of devotees to the area. Mainpuri hosts the Kans ka mela on Chaitra and the popular Narain ka mela which attracts nearly 10,000 people. The 20-day exhibition-cum-trade fair organised at Sheetla Mata Mandir on April in Udetpur Abhai village is also popular. Fairs in gurudwaras on the occasion of Baisakhi are also attended by people of all religions and castes.
 Notable temples: The city has some very old and popular Hindu temples. These include Sheetla Devi Temple, where every year during March/April, a rural exhibition-cum-trade fair is held for 20 days. Bhimsen Mandir is an ancient Shiva temple and Falahari Ashram situated on Jyoti-Devi Road has very a rare statue of the goddess Durga with 18 arms. Another ancient Shiv temple is Chandeshwar Mandir situated on Chandeshwar Road. Also located on Devi Road are the twin Shiv temples of Kale Mahadev and Shweat Mahadev. Hanuman Temple situated on old Tehsil Road is visited by thousands on Tuesdays and Saturdays.

Places of interest 

Fort/Garhi of Mainpuri is situated at old Mainpuri. The fort is not a spot of tourist interest. It is the private property of erstwhile raja of two estates, Mainpuri and Lawan (Dausa, Rajasthan) and repaired, maintained and restored by him.

Attractions include the parks Phoolbagh and Lohia Park. Phoolbagh is situated at Jail Chauraha while Lohia Park is situated at District Collectorate. Both have green lawns and fountains.

Mainpuri is also known for the sarus crane (Grus antigone). This bird, called krouncha in India, is revered as a symbol of marital fidelity and is celebrated in myth and legend. There are estimated to be 8,000-10,000 sarus cranes in India. Two-thirds of its population resides in the village Andani of Karhal.

Another place of interest in the Mainpuri District is the Saman Bird Sanctuary. The Siberian crane comes here in its migration cycle and stays for 3–4 months from November to February. Part-time wildlife photographer Mr. Shashank Raghav has contributed his photos to depict the wildlife of the Mainpuri District, especially the different species of birds which can be found in nearby areas of the Saman Bird Sanctuary within the Mainpuri district.

Education
Government Engineering College, Mainpuri is a government engineering college in Mainpuri. It is a constituent college of Dr. A.P.J. Abdul Kalam Technical University (formerly Uttar Pradesh Technical University) in Lucknow.

References

 
Districts of Uttar Pradesh
Agra division